Trifurcula victoris is a moth of the family Nepticulidae. It is only known from the extremely dry region in the southeast part of the Province of Almería in Spain.

The wingspan is 6.5-7.2 mm for males and 6.5–7 mm for females. Adult males have a uniformly coloured yellow patch and relatively pale forewings.

The larvae feed on Anthyllis cytisoides. The larva makes a hardly visible gallery in the bark of the host plant. The larvae are not visible in the mine. Mines were collected on stems, heavily infested by gall-forming coccids. The larvae were found in January and adults emerged from February to May.

External links
Nepticulidae and Opostegidae of the world

Nepticulidae
Moths of Europe
Moths described in 1990